Dmytro Kucher (born 25 August 1984) is a Ukrainian former professional boxer who competed from 2009 to 2018. He held the European cruiserweight title in 2016.

Professional career

Kucher vs. Maccarinelli 
On 10 June 2016, Kucher stopped Enzo Maccarinelli via first-round technical knockout (TKO) to win the vacant European cruiserweight title.

Kucher vs. Huck 
Kucher lost by Marco Huck via unanimous decision in their 12 round contest on 19th November, 2016. The scorecards read 117-111, 119-109 and 117-111 in favor of Huck.

Kucher vs. Lerena 
On 3 March, 2018, Kucher fought Kevin Lerena, ranked #4 by the IBF, #6 by the WBC and #9 by the WBA at cruiserweight. Kucher won the fight via unanimous decision.

Professional boxing record

{|class="wikitable" style="text-align:center; font-size:95%"
|-
!
!Result
!Record
!Opponent
!Type
!Round, time
!Date
!Location
!Notes
|-
|28
|Loss
|24–3–1
|style="text-align:left;"| Kevin Lerena
|UD
|12
|3 Mar 2018
|style="text-align:left;"| 
|style="text-align:left;"|
|-
|27
|Loss
|24–2–1
|style="text-align:left;"| Marco Huck
|UD
|12
|19 Nov 2016
|style="text-align:left;"| 
|style="text-align:left;"|
|-
|26
|Win
|24–1–1
|style="text-align:left;"| Enzo Maccarinelli
|TKO
|1 (12), 
|10 Jun 2016
|style="text-align:left;"|
|style="text-align:left;"|
|-
|25
|Draw
|23–1–1
|style="text-align:left;"| Bilal Laggoune
|SD
|12
|09 Oct 2015
|style="text-align:left;"|
|style="text-align:left;"|
|-align=center
|24
|Win
|23–1
|style="text-align:left;"| Bobby Thomas Jr
|RTD
|1 (8), 
|30 May 2015
|align=left|
|align=left|
|-align=center
|23
|Win
|22–1
|style="text-align:left;"| Galen Brown
|RTD
|4 (8), 
|24 Oct 2014
|style="text-align:left;"|
|style="text-align:left;"|
|-
|22
|Loss
|21–1
|style="text-align:left;"| Ilunga Makabu
|MD
|12
|13 Jul 2013
|style="text-align:left;"|
|style="text-align:left;"|
|-
|21
|Win
|21–0
|style="text-align:left;"| Julio Cesar Dos Santos
|UD
|12
|21 Mar 2013
|style="text-align:left;"|
|style="text-align:left;"|
|-align=center
|20
|Win
|20–0
|align=left| Willie Herring
|UD
|8
|22 Dec 2012
|align=left|
|align=left|
|-align=center
|19
|Win
|19–0
|align=left| Steve Herelius
|KO
|2 (12), 
|27 Oct 2012
|align=left|
|align=left|
|-align=center
|18
|Win
|18–0
|align=left| Geoffrey Battelo
|TKO
|5 (10), 
|19 Aug 2012
|align=left|
|align=left|
|-align=center
|17
|Win
|17–0
|align=left| Cesar David Crenz
|KO
|3 (12), 
|27 Jun 2012
|align=left|
|align=left|
|-align=center
|16
|Win
|16–0
|align=left| Walter David Cabral
|KO
|2 (10)
|27 Apr 2012
|align=left|
|align=left|
|-align=center
|15
|Win
|15–0
|align=left| Lubos Suda
|RTD
|8 (10), 
|26 Feb 2012
|align=left|
|align=left|
|-align=center
|14
|Win
|14–0
|align=left| Ismail Abdoul
|UD
|8
|18 Dec 2011
|align=left|
|align=left|
|-align=center
|13
|Win
|13–0
|align=left| Sandro Siproshvili
|UD
|8
|03 Oct 2011
|align=left|
|align=left|
|-align=center
|12
|Win
|12–0
|align=left| Ali Ismailov
|RTD
|7 (8), 
|11 Jun 2011
|align=left|
|align=left|
|-align=center
|11
|Win
|11–0
|align=left| Kim Johnny Jenssen
|TKO
|3 (8)
|19 Nov 2010
|align=left|
|align=left|
|-align=center
|10
|Win
|10–0
|align=left| Joey Vegas
|UD
|8
|28 Aug 2010
|align=left|
|align=left|
|-align=center
|9
|Win
|9–0
|align=left| Mikhail Nasyrov
|RTD
|6 (8), 
|21 May 2010
|align=left|
|align=left|
|-align=center
|8
|Win
|8–0
|align=left| Ion Gaivan
|TKO
|5 (6), 
|13 Mar 2010
|align=left|
|align=left|
|-align=center
|7
|Win
|7–0
|align=left| Teymuraz Kekelidze
|KO
|2 (8), 
|06 Feb 2010
|align=left|
|align=left|
|-align=center
|6
|Win
|6–0
|align=left| Vasyl Kondor
|RTD
|4 (8), 
|28 Nov 2009
|align=left|
|align=left|
|-align=center
|5
|Win
|5–0
|align=left| Kostiantyn Okhrei
|KO
|2 (6), 
|17 Sep 2009
|align=left|
|align=left|
|-align=center
|4
|Win
|4–0
|align=left| Yuriy Horbenko
|UD
|6
|15 Sep 2009
|align=left|
|align=left|
|-align=center
|3
|Win
|3–0
|align=left| Maksym Stasiuk
|TKO
|1 (4)
|13 Jun 2009
|align=left|
|align=left|
|-align=center
|2
|Win
|2–0
|align=left| Sergey Pronin
|TKO
|3 (4)
|25 Apr 2009
|align=left|
|align=left|
|-align=center
|1
|Win
|1–0
|align=left| Yuriy Bilinchuk
|TKO
|4 (4)
|14 Mar 2009
|align=left|
|align=left|
|-align=center

References

External links
 
 Dmytro Kucher - Profile, News Archive & Current Rankings at Box.Live

Living people
1984 births
Ukrainian male boxers
Sportspeople from Vinnytsia
Cruiserweight boxers